The year 1627 in science and technology involved some significant events.

Astronomy
 Johannes Kepler's Rudolphine Tables are published.

Exploration
 January – The Dutch ship 't Gulden Zeepaert, skippered by François Thijssen, sails along the south coast of Australia.

Medicine
 Adriaan van den Spiegel's  is published posthumously in Venice with illustrations by Giulio Casserio.
 Gaspare Aselli's  is published posthumously in Milan.

Publications
 Francis Bacon's , or A Natural History and New Atlantis are published posthumously.

Births
 January 25 – Robert Boyle, Anglo-Irish chemist (died 1691)
 November 29 – John Ray, English naturalist (died 1705)

Deaths
 February 22 – Olivier van Noort Dutch circumnavigator (born 1558)
 July 20 – Guðbrandur Þorláksson, Icelandic mathematician and cartographer (born 1541)
 October 21 – Frederick de Houtman, Dutch explorer (born 1571)

References

 
17th century in science
1620s in science